

Physics and mathematics
Arnold Sommerfeld was a German theoretical physicist whom the following is named after:
 Sommerfeld coefficient
 Sommerfeld constant (α)
 Sommerfeld expansion
 Sommerfeld effect
 Sommerfeld identity
 Sommerfeld number
 Sommerfeld parameter
 Sommerfeld radiation condition
 Sommerfeld's approximation
 Sommerfeld–Goubau line
 Sommerfeld–Kossel displacement law
 Sommerfeld–Runge method
 Sommerfeld–Watson representation
 Sommerfeld–Wilson ratio
 Sommerfeld–Zenneck surface wave 
 Bohr–Sommerfeld model 
Sommerfeld–Wilson quantization 
 Drude–Sommerfeld model
 Gamow–Sommerfeld factor
 Grimm–Sommerfeld  rule
 Orr–Sommerfeld equation
 Rayleigh–Sommerfeld diffraction theory

Astronomical objects
Sommerfeld crater
32809 Sommerfeld, minor planet

Arnold Sommerfeld
Sommerfeld